Michael Desport Romano (born March 3, 1972) is a former Major League Baseball pitcher who played for one season. He pitched for the Toronto Blue Jays for three games during its 1999 season.

See also
1992 College Baseball All-America Team

External links
, or Retrosheet
Pelota Binaria (Venezuelan Winter League)

1972 births
Living people
American expatriate baseball players in Canada
American expatriate baseball players in Japan
American expatriate baseball players in Mexico
American expatriate baseball players in South Korea
American people of Italian descent
Baseball players from Illinois
Baseball players from New Orleans
Cardenales de Lara players
American expatriate baseball players in Venezuela
Dunedin Blue Jays players
Hagerstown Suns players
Hiroshima Toyo Carp players
KBO League pitchers
Knoxville Smokies players
Major League Baseball pitchers
Medicine Hat Blue Jays players
Mexican League baseball pitchers
Nippon Professional Baseball pitchers
Olmecas de Tabasco players
Richmond Braves players
Salt Lake Buzz players
Saraperos de Saltillo players
SSG Landers players
Syracuse SkyChiefs players
Toronto Blue Jays players
Tulane Green Wave baseball players